Brandon Smith (born February 25, 1973) is a Canadian former professional ice hockey defenceman who played parts of four seasons in the National Hockey League (NHL) for the Boston Bruins and New York Islanders between 1999 and 2003. He played in a total of 33 NHL games and registered 3 goals and 4 assists. The rest of his career, which lasted from 1994 to 2010, was mainly spent in the minor American Hockey League, where he spent 13 seasons before playing 3 final seasons in the German Deutsche Eishockey Liga.

Career statistics

Regular season and playoffs

Award and honours
 WHL West Second All-Star Team (1993, 1994)
 ECHL First All-Star Team (1995)
 ECHL Defenceman of the Year (1995)
 AHL First All-Star Team (1999)

External links
 

1973 births
Living people
Adirondack Red Wings players
Boston Bruins players
Bridgeport Sound Tigers players
Canadian expatriate ice hockey players in Germany
Canadian ice hockey defencemen
Cleveland Barons (2001–2006) players
Dayton Bombers players
Eisbären Berlin players
Ice hockey people from British Columbia
Minnesota Moose players
New York Islanders players
Portland Winterhawks players
Providence Bruins players
Rochester Americans players
Straubing Tigers players
Undrafted National Hockey League players